State Route 461 (SR 461) is state highway located entirely in Stewart County, Tennessee.

Route description

SR 461 begins at an intersection with US 79 and SR 76 in Dover. It travels north, and after , it enters the Land Between the Lakes National Recreation Area and meets its northern terminus just inside the park boundary. 
The road continues as The Trace. The highway is part of the National Scenic Byway system.

History
Until the 2000s, SR 461 was signed as SR 49.

Junction list

See also

References

461
Transportation in Stewart County, Tennessee
Dover, Tennessee